John Addison Fordyce (born 16 February 1858 in Guernsey County, Ohio, died on 4 June 1925 in New York City) was an American dermatologist, whose name is associated with Fordyce's spot (also known as Fordyce's disease or Fordyce's lesion), Angiokeratoma of Fordyce, Brooke–Fordyce trichoepithelioma, and Fox–Fordyce disease.

Fordyce graduated in 1881 with a degree in medicine from the Chicago Medical College. He began his career in Hot Springs, Arkansas, but would travel to Europe in 1886. There he studied dermatology in Vienna and Paris. He returned to the States and settled down in New York, where he was a specialist in dermatology and syphilis. From 1889 to 1893 he taught at the New York Polyclinic, and later he served as a professor at the Bellevue Hospital College and the Columbia University College of Physicians and Surgeons.

References

Feinberg School of Medicine alumni
Columbia University faculty
1858 births
1925 deaths
American dermatologists
People from Guernsey County, Ohio